Pinki Kaushik Singh (born 14 August 1980) is a female international lawn bowler from India.

Bowls career

Commonwealth Games
Pinki has represented India at four Commonwealth Games; in the triples at the 2010 Commonwealth Games, in the pairs and fours at the 2014 Commonwealth Games, in the singles and triples at the 2018 Commonwealth Games and in the triples and fours at the 2022 Commonwealth Games. In the 2022 competition, she was part of the Women's fours Indian team, along with (Lovely Choubey, Nayanmoni Saikia and Rupa Rani Tirkey) which won Gold beating South Africa in the final, 17-10.

Asia Pacific Championships 
Pinki has won a bronze medal at the 2009 Asia Pacific Bowls Championships.

Asian Championships 
In the Asian Lawn Bowls Championship, Pinki has won bronze medal in women's triples in 2014, silver in women's triples and bronze in women's fours in 2016, and gold in women's triples in 2017.

In 2023, she won the fours gold medal at the 14th Asian Lawn Bowls Championship in Kuala Lumpur.

References

Living people
1980 births
Indian bowls players
Sportswomen from Delhi
Bowls players at the 2010 Commonwealth Games
Bowls players at the 2014 Commonwealth Games
Bowls players at the 2018 Commonwealth Games
Bowls players at the 2022 Commonwealth Games
Commonwealth Games gold medallists for India
Commonwealth Games medallists in lawn bowls
Indian sportspeople
21st-century Indian women
Medallists at the 2022 Commonwealth Games